The 1993 Copa Interamericana was the 15th. edition of the Copa Interamericana. The final was contested by Costa Rican team Deportivo Saprissa (winner of 1993 CONCACAF Champions' Cup) and Chilean club Universidad Católica (runner-up of 1993 Copa Libertadores so current champion São Paulo declined to participate). The final was played under a two-leg format in September–November 1994. 

The first leg was held in Estadio Ricardo Saprissa Aymá in San José, where Saprissa defeat U. Católica 3–1. The second leg was played at Estadio San Carlos de Apoquindo in Las Condes, where Universidad Católica beat Saprissa 5–1 in extra time. With one win per side, the Chilean team won their first Interamericana cup by goal difference (6–4).

Qualified teams

Venues

Match details

First Leg

Second Leg

References

Copa Interamericana
i
i
i
i